Tales from Topographic Oceans is the sixth studio album by English progressive rock band Yes, released on 7 December 1973 by Atlantic Records. It is their first studio album to feature drummer Alan White, who had replaced Bill Bruford in the previous year. Frontman Jon Anderson devised its concept during the Close to the Edge Tour, when he read a footnote in Autobiography of a Yogi by Paramahansa Yogananda that describes four bodies of Hindu texts about a specific field of knowledge, collectively named shastras–śruti, smriti, puranas, and tantras. After pitching the idea to guitarist Steve Howe, the pair spent the rest of the tour developing an outline of the album's musical themes and lyrics.

Rehearsals lasted for two months in London, during which the band decided to produce a double album containing four side-long tracks based on each text, ranging between 18 and 21 minutes. Keyboardist Rick Wakeman was critical of the concept and felt unable to contribute to the more experimental music that was being produced to fit a double album, and distanced himself from the group. Yes decided against recording in the countryside in order to use Britain's first 24-track machine at Morgan Studios, where they decorated the studio to resemble a farm. Roger Dean incorporated suggestions from the band into the album's cover art, which inspired his designs for the stage used on its tour.

Tales from Topographic Oceans received mixed reviews upon release and became a symbol of the perceived excesses of the progressive rock, but earned a more positive reception in later years. It was a commercial success, becoming the first UK album to be certified Gold based solely on pre-orders, and spent two weeks at number one. In the US it peaked at number 6, where it was certified gold in 1974 for surpassing 500,000 copies. Yes toured the album for five months across Europe and North America, the first half of which featured the entire album performed live. Wakeman, who was against playing the whole album, quit the band at its conclusion to continue his solo career. In 2003, the album was remastered with previously unreleased tracks, and an edition with new stereo and 5.1 surround sound mixes by Steven Wilson, with additional bonus tracks, followed in 2016.

Background and writing

Conception

By 1973, Yes had stabilised with a line-up of frontman and lead vocalist Jon Anderson, bassist Chris Squire, guitarist Steve Howe, keyboardist Rick Wakeman, and drummer Alan White, who had replaced original drummer Bill Bruford in the previous year. Their fifth album, Close to the Edge (1972), was released to commercial and critical acclaim, and the band toured worldwide to support the album between July 1972 and April 1973.

Anderson had begun searching for ideas for their next album during this time, one of which involved a "large-scale composition" as the group were writing successful longform pieces, including the 18-minute "Close to the Edge". While in his hotel room in Tokyo during the Japanese tour in March 1973, Anderson found himself "caught up in a lengthy footnote" in Autobiography of a Yogi by Paramahansa Yogananda which outlines four bodies of Hindu texts named shastras. Yogananda described them as "comprehensive treatises [that cover] every aspect of religious and social life, and the fields of law, medicine, architecture, art..." that "convey profound truths under a veil of detailed symbolism". Anderson "became engrossed" with the idea of a "four-part epic" concept album based on the four texts, though he later admitted that he only had a basic understanding of them. King Crimson drummer and percussionist Jamie Muir recommended Yogananda's book to Anderson at Bruford's wedding reception earlier in the month. Anderson said of Muir: "I felt I had to learn from him. We started talking about meditation in music—not the guru type but some really heavy stuff." Anderson gained further clarification of the texts from talking to Vera Stanley Alder, a mystic, painter, and author of spirituality books that had a profound influence on him. The 1973 BBC documentary series The Ascent of Man also gave Anderson "a lot to think about", and was influenced by host Jacob Bronowski's explanations of Earth, the solar system, and human "knowledge and truth".

Yes moved on to Australia and the US in March and April 1973, during which Anderson pitched his idea to Howe, a prolific songwriter and arranger in the group, who took an interest in building on Anderson's concept. The pair held writing sessions in their hotel rooms lit by candlelight, exchanging musical and lyrical ideas. Howe recalled: "Jon would say to me, 'What have you got that's a bit like that...?' so I'd play him something and he'd go: 'that's great. Have you got anything else?' and I'd play him another tune". One riff that Howe played was initially discarded, but it was later incorporated into side three as by then, the two sought for a different theme that would suit the track. Howe looked back on this time as a "golden opportunity" for Anderson and himself to "explore the outer reaches of our possibilities", and avoided predictable choruses and song structures. A six-hour session in Savannah, Georgia, that ended at 7 a.m. saw Anderson and Howe complete the outline of the album's vocals, lyrics, and instrumentation, which took the form of one track based on each of the four texts. Anderson described the night as "magical [that] left both of us exhilarated for days". Anderson and Howe presented the album's concept to the rest of the band, which was met with some uncertainty; Howe recalled: "But Jon and I did manage to sell the idea ... sometimes [we] really had to spur the guys on".

Phil Carson, then the London Senior Vice President of Atlantic Records, remembered that, during a dinner with Anderson and Nesuhi Ertegun, Anderson was originally going to name the album Tales from Tobographic Oceans. He claimed he had invented the word "tobographic", which he used to depict one of astronomer Fred Hoyle's theories on space. Ertegun informed Anderson that "tobographic" was similar to the word "topographic" and described its meaning, and Anderson changed the title accordingly. Wakeman jokingly nicknamed the album Tales from Toby's Graphic Go-Kart.

Rehearsals at Manticore

After touring finished, Yes regrouped at Manticore Studios in Fulham, London, a former cinema bought by fellow progressive rock band Emerson, Lake & Palmer, in May 1973. They spent eight weeks rehearsing and developing Anderson and Howe's initial ideas. This resulted in four tracks, as Wakeman described: "One was about eight minutes. One was 15. One was 19 and one was 12", but the band had to decide whether to refine them to fit a single album or extend them to make a double. Howe recalled a mutual agreement to make a double, which Wakeman supported provided that the group could come up with strong enough material. Anderson had gained confidence towards a double from the success of Yessongs, their first live album, released as a triple in May 1973 that contained almost 130 minutes of music. Wakeman described an early musical concept for Tales from Topographic Oceans around the time of its release, whereby its parts could be interchangeable at any time depending on the audience's reaction, thus allowing the band to perform upbeat portions back to back and skip the slower sections until a later time in the piece. The problem, however, was putting such a concept on a record.

The group agreed to make a double album but had no ideas at hand to develop, so the four tracks were fleshed out through improvisations. Wakeman disagreed with the "almost busking, free-form thinking" approach and the musical "padding" that resulted, which he thought needed further rehearsal. He felt sections resembled "avant-garde jazz rock, and I had nothing to offer". Squire recognised "a lot of substance" to the four tracks but at times they lacked strength, which resulted in an album that was varied and scattered. Despite the uncertainty, Anderson stated in the liner notes that Squire, Wakeman, and White made important contributions to the music. Anderson looked back at this time and thought the band were on the same page, but disagreements from Wakeman and producer Eddy Offord marked the end of the period of "illusive harmony" that had been in the group since Fragile. Yes took a break roughly one month into rehearsals, during which Anderson vacated to Marrakesh with his family and wrote lyrics.

Recording
The group were split in deciding where to record; Anderson and Wakeman wanted to retreat in the countryside while Squire and Howe preferred to stay in London, leaving White, who was indifferent, as the tie-breaking vote. Anderson wanted to record at night under a tent in a forest with electrical generators buried into the ground so they would be inaudible, but "when I suggested that, they all said, 'Jon, get a life!'" Yes were joined by Offord, their engineer and producer who had worked with the band since 1970 and mixed their sound on tour. He pushed their manager, Brian Lane, to record in the country, thinking "some flowers and trees" would lessen the tension that the album was creating within the group. Yes were swayed to remain in London, but wanted to avoid the familiar surroundings of Advision Studios in Fitzrovia, so they chose to record at Morgan Studios in Willesden as it housed a 3M M79, Britain's first 24-track tape machine, which presented greater possibilities in the studio. Despite the advantage, the machine malfunctioned often and required periods of down time for repairs. Squire worked in the studio for as long as sixteen-hour days, seven days a week.

In July 1973, Yes settled into studio 3 at Morgan for a period of ten weeks. Lane and Anderson proceeded to decorate the studio to resemble a farm; Squire believed Lane did so as a joke on Anderson as his tent idea was shut down. Anderson brought in flowers, pots of greenery, and cutout cows and sheep; white picket fences were placed around Wakeman's keyboards with amplifiers placed on stacks of hay. When Black Sabbath moved into studio 4 to record Sabbath Bloody Sabbath, singer Ozzy Osbourne visited and recalled a model cow with electronic udders and a small barn in the corner, "like a kid's plaything." Offord remembered the cows being covered in graffiti and the plants dying halfway through recording, "that just kind of sums up that whole album". One time during recording, Anderson wanted to replicate the sound he heard while singing in the bathroom and asked lighting engineer Michael Tait to build him a three-sided tiled booth for him to sing in. Despite Tait explaining how the idea would not work, he built one using plywood and glued tiles on the inside. Sound engineer Nigel Luby recalled tiles falling off the box during takes. Wakeman distanced himself from the band as recording went on and spent most of his time drinking and playing darts in the studio bar. Osborne befriended him and remembered Wakeman was "bored out of his mind", and invited him to play the synthesizer on "Sabbra Cadabra". Wakeman would not accept money for his contribution, so the band paid him in beer. While talking to reporter Chris Welch in August 1973, Anderson dispelled rumours that no one was quitting the band, and that a difference of opinion from an unnamed member had been resolved.

Yes spent one week putting down the backing tracks for each of the four songs, after which they worked on the overdubs. Howe said a considerable amount of time was spent on both tasks, and took turns with Anderson to lead and convince the other members when they questioned if the arrangements were going to work. Anderson recalled a near-disaster situation with the finished tapes. After working through the night with Offord to complete the last mix, the pair left Morgan at dawn and Offord placed the tapes on the roof his car to find the keys. He proceeded to drive off, forgetting about the tapes. They stopped the car to find the tapes had fallen onto the road, and Anderson rushed back to save them from an oncoming bus. The tapes were unharmed from the incident. Yes had spent five months arranging, rehearsing, and recording Tales from Topographic Oceans, and their time spent in Morgan amounted to £90,000 in studio costs.

Songs

The album contains four tracks, or "movements", as described by Anderson, that range between 18 and 21 minutes. All band members are credited for composing the music. Anderson provided a short description of how the album came together, and how its concept is expressed in a musical sense in each track, in the album's liner notes. The original LP lists Anderson and Howe as co-writers of the lyrics, but the 2003 reissue lists Squire as an additional co-author for "The Ancient" and Squire, Wakeman, and White as additional co-authors for "The Remembering".

"The Revealing Science of God (Dance of the Dawn)" is based on the shruti, which Yogananda described as scriptures that are "directly heard" or "revealed", in particular the Vedas. Regarding its title, Anderson said: "It's always delicate to start talking about religious things ... [it] should have just been 'The Revealing'. But I got sort of hip." The track was originally 28 minutes long, but six minutes were cut due to the time constraints of a vinyl. Anderson was inspired to open the track with voices that gradually build from listening to Gregorian chants, and used the Vietnam War as a source for its lyrics. Howe plays a Gibson ES-345, and his solos were influenced by his belief that Frank Zappa performed lengthy solos "because the audience wanted it. I was thinking at one stage, 'I'll do that. They'll love it'. The "Young Christians see it" section originated from an unused take from the Fragile sessions, a take from which was released as a bonus track in 2015 as "All Fighters Past". White recalled the group spent around six days mixing the track. The 2003 CD reissue of the album includes a previously unreleased two minute introduction.

"The Remembering (High the Memory)" relates to the smriti, texts literally meaning "that which is remembered". Yogananda wrote the smritis were "written down in a remote past as the world's longest epic poems", specifically the Mahabharata and Ramayana. Anderson described it as "a calm sea of music" and wanted the band to play like the sea with "rhythms, eddies, swells, and undercurrents" of sound. The track includes a keyboard solo that Anderson wrote "bring[s] alive the ebb and flow and depth of our mind's eye", and rated it as one of Wakeman's best. Squire played a fretless Guild bass, and described his performance as "one of the nicest things" he has done, and ranked it higher than his playing on more popular songs. He considered the track was particularly successful in its arrangement. White came up with the chord basis of a section on a guitar, which he does not play confidently, but Anderson recognised his tune and told him to repeat it until he could grasp his idea. Howe plays a Danelectro electric sitar, lute, and acoustic guitar.

"The Ancient (Giants Under the Sun)" is attributed to the puranas, meaning "of ancient times", which contain eighteen "ancient" allegories. "Steve's guitar", wrote Anderson, "is pivotal in sharpening reflection on the beauties and treasures of lost civilisations." The lyrics contain several translations of the word "Sun" or an explanation of the Sun from various languages. Howe felt the opening section amazes him to this day, thinking how the band could "go so far out". He plays a steel guitar and a Spanish Ramirez acoustic guitar, and described it as "quite Stravinsky, quite folky". To help achieve the right sound he wanted out of his guitars, Howe played several recordings by classical guitarist Julian Bream to Offord as a guide. The track ends with an acoustic-based song which later became known as "Leaves of Green". White used a hollowed out log and brushes on an aluminium sheet as percussion.

"Ritual (Nous sommes du soleil)" relates to the tantras, literally meaning rites or rituals. Anderson described its bass and drum solos as a presentation of the fight and struggle that life presents between "sources of evil and pure love". Howe is particularly fond of his guitar solo at the beginning, which to him was "spine-chilling" and "heavenly to play", and uses a Gibson Les Paul Junior. He wrote the chords and some lyrics to the "Life is like a fight" section. His outro guitar solo was more improvised and jazz-oriented at first, but the rest of the group felt dissatisfied with the arrangement. Anderson suggested that Howe pick several themes from the album and combine them, which Howe did with "a more concise, more thematic approach". During one of Wakeman's absences from the studio, White came up with the piano sequence for the closing "Nous sommes du soleil" section. The second half contains a percussion jam that features the main melody played on the drums. White, who played a standard kit, taught the sequence to the other members, with Anderson on a cocktail kit and Squire on timpani. Howe, despite participating on the drum solo on stage early on, opted out as it affected his guitar playing afterward.

Artwork
The album was packaged as a gatefold sleeve designed and illustrated by Roger Dean, who had also designed the artwork for Fragile, Close to the Edge, and Yessongs. Each of them carried a loose narrative thread that Dean did not continue for Tales from Topographic Oceans. Dean and Anderson discussed ideas for the cover during a flight from London to Tokyo via Anchorage, Alaska, for the Japanese leg of the Close to the Edge Tour. Prior to the flight, Dean had completed the artwork to John Michell's book The View over Atlantis. He recalled: "The wives and girlfriends made a cake ... and we all had some. I have no idea what was in it but from London to Anchorage, I was stoned ... But from Anchorage to Tokyo, I couldn't stop talking. And I was telling Jon all about this book, about patterns in the landscape and dragon lines, and we were flying hour after hour after hour over the most amazing landscapes ... So the idea of ... a sort of magical landscape and an alternative landscape ... that informed everything: the album cover, the merchandising, the stage."

Dean, who primarily describes himself as a landscape painter, wished to convey his enthusiasm for landscapes on the cover, and everything depicted in the design is of something that exists. Painted using watercolour and ink, the front depicts fish circling a waterfall under several constellations of stars. In his book Views, Dean explained that the final collection of landmarks on the front was more complex than intended "because it seemed appropriate to the nature of the project that everyone who wanted to contribute should do so." Anderson wanted a Mayan temple at Chichen Itza with the sun behind it, and White suggested using markings from the plains of Nazca. The landscape comprised, amongst other things, famous English rocks taken from Dominy Hamilton's postcard collection, including Brimham Rocks, the last rocks at Land's End, Logan Rock at Treen, and single stones from Avebury and Stonehenge. Dean thought "the result is a somewhat incongruous mixture, but effective nonetheless."

Initial pressings included a slipstream in the background behind the fish that was removed from later copies. Although it was not a part of the original design, Anderson persuaded Dean to add it after it had been painted, so Dean drew it on a clear cel and photographed the cover with and without the slipstream. Dean thought the idea still did not work, and used the original design for the advertisements and posters. In 2002, readers of Rolling Stone magazine voted the album's cover as the best cover art of all time.

Release
The album was finished in the first week of November 1973, and aired on British radio several times before its release in stores. It was set for broadcast on David Jensen's show on Radio Luxembourg on 8 November, but according to Anderson, the radio station somehow received blank tapes, resulting in dead air after the album was introduced. Two more radio broadcasts followed, one on Your Mother Wouldn't Like It hosted by Nicky Horne on Capital Radio on 9 November, and on Rock on Radio One with Pete Drummond on BBC Radio 1 the following day. A listening session was held at Morgan, which studio engineer and manager Roger Quested attended and remembered rows of seats laid out by a set of speakers before the whole album was played. "All but the diehard had drifted away before it had finished." Radio consultant Lee Abrams recalled the risk and difficulty in getting the album played on American radio, with many stations mainly playing "The Revealing Science of God" and primarily at night hours.

The album was released in the UK on 7 December 1973, followed by its North American release on 9 January 1974. It was a commercial success for the group; following a change in industry regulations by the British Phonographic Industry for albums to qualify for a Gold disc in April 1973, the album became the first UK record to reach Gold certification based on pre-orders alone after 75,000 orders were made. It was number 1 on the UK Album Chart for two consecutive weeks and peaked at number 6 on the US Billboard Top LPs chart. The album was certified Gold in the UK on 1 March 1974 and in the US on 8 February 1974, the latter for surpassing 500,000 copies.

Reception

Early reviews 
The album received an initial divided reception from British critics. Robert Sheldon for The Times termed the music as "rockophonic", and selected "The Ancient" as a piece of music that "will be studied twenty-five years hence as a turning point in modern music". The Guardian newspaper thought Anderson's "high-pitched and carefully modulated voice ... seemed at ease and control". Steve Peacock reviewed the album and a live performance of it for Sounds magazine using the headlines "Wishy washy tales from the deep" and "Close to boredom". Critic and Yes biographer Chris Welch reviewed the album for Melody Maker and wrote: "It is a fragmented masterpiece, assembled with loving care and long hours in the studio. Brilliant in patches, but often taking far too long to make its various points, and curiously lacking in warmth or personal expression". He thought "Ritual" brought the "first enjoyable moments" of the entire album, "where Alan's driving drums have something to grip on to and the lyrics of la la la speak volumes. But even this cannot last long and cohesion is lost once more to the gods of drab self-indulgence." For New Musical Express, Steve Clarke, who had listened to the album for two months and saw the band perform the album live once, declared the album "a great disappointment", coming from the strength of Close to the Edge and notes the "colour and excitement" that the group usually puts on their albums was missing. He thought Wakeman's abilities were restricted, and a lack of "positive construction" in the music which too often loses itself to "a wash of synthetic sounds". Howe's guitar adopts the same tone as Wakeman's keyboards, which bored Clarke, but Anderson was praised in helping carry the music through with his "frail, pure and at times very beautiful" voice. Clarke concluded with a hope of Yes making a return to "real songs" which demonstrate their musicianship better.

The album also received mixed reviews in America. Abrams thought it could have received better marketing, and suggested "an experiment in recording" as a tag line. Record World magazine considered it "by far the most progressive album to date" and displays the talents of each band member well, particularly Wakeman's. A review in Billboard said the four sides produce mixed results, with Anderson's "weighty spiritual concept" having "indigestible lyrics that are fortunately outplayed by the band's rich, sweeping playing" and praised Wakeman's keyboards in particular. It concluded with "Ritual (Nous sommes du soleil)" as the most "complete" track. In his negative review for Rolling Stone, Gordon Fletcher described the record as "psychedelic doodles" and thought it suffers from "over-elaboration" compared to more successful songs on Fragile and Close to the Edge. He complained about the album's length, Howe's guitar solos on "The Ancient", and the percussion section on "Ritual", but praised Wakeman for his "stellar performance" throughout and believed the keyboardist was the "most human of the group". Fletcher singled out the acoustic guitar section from "The Ancient" as the album's high point. Cash Box magazine praised the album with its "spectacular cuts" making a "phenomenal" record, and noted the band "are as much in touch with the bright future of their art form as they are with its rich, traditional past". Wakeman's "inspirational" playing was also pointed out which "sparkles" throughout the album. It concluded with "one of this year's best without doubt." In September 1974, Time magazine called it "by far the most provocative album of the past year."

Later reviews 
Retrospectively, Bruce Eder of AllMusic thought the album contains "some of the most sublimely beautiful musical passages ever to come from the group, and develops a major chunk of that music in depth and degrees in ways that one can only marvel at, though there's a big leap from marvel to enjoy. If one can grab onto it, Tales is a long, sometimes glorious musical ride across landscapes strange and wonderful, thick with enticing musical textures". In its fortieth anniversary issue from 1992, NME selected Tales from Topographic Oceans as their "40 Records That Captured The Moment". In 1996, Progression magazine writer John Covach wrote that it is Tales from Topographic Oceans, not Close to the Edge, that represents the band's true hallmark of the first half of their 1970s output and their "real point of arrival". He pointed out "the playing is virtuosic throughout, the singing innovative and often complex, and the lyrics mystical and poetic. All this having been asserted ... even the most devoted listener to Tales is also forced to admit that the album is in many ways flawed. Tracks tend to wander a bit ... and the music therefore is perhaps not as focussed as it might be." He notes that while Howe "set a new standard for rock guitar", he thought Wakeman's parts were not used properly and that the keyboardist was instead "relegated to the role of sideman". Author and critic Martin Popoff called the album the "black hole of Yes experiences, the band dissipating, expanding, exploding and imploding all at once", though he thought it contained "some fairly accessible music".

Band members 
In January 1974, Squire picked The Yes Album and Tales from Topographic Oceans as the two most personally satisfying Yes albums "in terms of being captivated". In 1984, after Yes had released 90125 (1983), Anderson looked back on Tales from Topographic Oceans as "difficult in some respects", but felt it was "stupid to even think about defending it." In 1990, he said that he was pleased with three quarters of the album, with the remaining quarter "not quite jelling", but the tight deadline to finish it meant there was little time to make the necessary changes. Squire recalled the album as an unhappy period in the band's history, and commented on Anderson's attitude then: "Jon had this visionary idea that you could just walk into a studio, and if the vibes were right ... the music would be great at the end of the day ... It isn't reality". Wakeman continues to hold a mostly critical view. In 2006, he clarified that there are some "very nice musical moments in Topographic Oceans, but because of the format of how records used to be we had too much for a single album but not enough for a double, so we padded it out and the padding is awful ... but there are some beautiful solos like "Nous sommes du soleil" ... one of the most beautiful melodies ... and deserved to be developed even more perhaps."

Reissues
Anderson spoke about his wish to edit the album and reissue it as a condensed 60-minute version with remixes and overdubs, but the plan was affected by "personality problems". The album was digitally remastered for CD by Joe Gastwirt using the original master tapes, in 1994. It was remastered again by Bill Inglot in 2003 as an "expanded" version on Elektra/Rhino Records, which features a restored two-minute introduction to "The Revealing Science of God" not included on the original LP, but previously released on the 2002 box set In a Word: Yes (1969–). The set includes studio run-throughs of the same track and "The Ancient". The 2003 edition was included in the band's 2013 studio album box set, The Studio Albums 1969–1987.

Tales from Topographic Oceans was reissued with new stereo and 5.1 surround sound mixes by Steven Wilson in October 2016 on the Panegyric label. The four-disc set was available on CD and Blu-ray or DVD-Audio and includes the new mixes, bonus and previously unreleased mixes and tracks, and expanded and restored cover art.

Tour and aftermath

Yes had planned to start touring the album with an American leg from October 1973, but it was cancelled in order to have more time to complete it in the studio. Shortly after its release, Anderson wished the album and tour was pushed back until January 1974 to allocate more time for rehearsals, but half of the available tickets for the opening British tour had quickly sold and the band were unable to cancel. Yes sold out five consecutive nights at the Rainbow Theatre in London, which marked the first time a rock band achieved the feat. They tried to secure two extra shows, but the dates were unavailable; promoter Harvey Goldsmith said the huge demand for tickets for the UK dates was comparable to a Rolling Stones tour. The first Rainbow show was to be filmed by the BBC for broadcast on The Old Grey Whistle Test and to air on radio, but recording did not go ahead. Initial tour rehearsals took place at Manticore.

The 77-date tour visited Europe and North America between November 1973 and April 1974, with a two-hour set of Close to the Edge and Tales from Topographic Oceans performed in their entirety, plus encores. The band toured with no support act. The set was altered as the tour progressed; within a month Lane, Tait, and the road crew had advised Yes to drop "The Ancient" as they thought it was dragging the set, but the group had started to perform it better and kept it in. "The Remembering" was removed completely from March. The North American leg included two sold-out shows at Madison Square Garden in New York City that grossed over $200,000. The band spent £5,000 on a hot air balloon which was decorated with the album's artwork and tethered in each city they performed in the US.

Yes brought four times as much equipment than their previous tours, which included an elaborate set designed by Dean and his brother Martyn. Two versions of the stage were built; the second, used from the American leg onward, consisted of fibreglass structures, dry ice effects, a drum platform surrounding White, and a tunnel that the band emerged from. During one show, the structure around White that opened and closed failed to operate, leaving him trapped. White claimed the incident was the inspiration behind a scene depicted in the rock mockumentary This Is Spinal Tap. Tait spent £10,000 on lighting equipment for the tour, and Offord mixed the band's live sound using a 24-track mixing desk.

No full recording from the tour has been officially released, apart from a performance of "Ritual" from Zurich in April 1974 on the album's 2016 reissue. Yes continued to perform "Ritual" until the end of their 1976 North American tour, after which material from Tales from Topographic Oceans would not be performed for 20 years, when the album's line-up reunited for the Keys to Ascension albums and performed "The Revealing Science of God". From 1997 to 2004 either "The Revealing Science of God" or "Ritual" was performed live, which included the latter performed with an orchestra on stage in 2001. From 2016 to 2018, Yes performed sides one and four as part of their Album Series Tour.

Wakeman's departure
Following the Rainbow gigs Wakeman called for a band meeting and announced his decision to quit, but the band, Lane, and Carson convinced him to stay for the rest of the tour. His frustration from playing the entire album, and the lack of rehearsal time for the British tour, culminated at a subsequent show in Manchester where his technician brought him a curry which he ate on stage. Roadie Bill Turner recalled Wakeman waving to the audience with a hand puppet and running a wind-up toy dinosaur across the stage when he got bored. Anderson felt he had pushed Wakeman too far, as he was unsatisfied with one of his keyboard solos in the set and had constantly asked him to get it right. Despite the problems, Wakeman said the situation improved as the American leg progressed. When the tour finished, Wakeman declined to attend rehearsals for their next album and confirmed his exit on 18 May 1974, his twenty-fifth birthday; later that day, he found out his solo album, Journey to the Centre of the Earth, had entered the UK chart at number one. Wakeman was replaced by Swiss keyboardist Patrick Moraz.

Track listing

Personnel
Yes
 Jon Anderson – lead vocals, percussion
 Steve Howe – guitars, electric sitar, lute, backing vocals
 Chris Squire – bass guitar, backing vocals
 Rick Wakeman – keyboards
 Alan White – drums, percussion

Technical
 Yes – producer
 Eddy Offord – producer
 Guy Bidmead – tapes
 Roger Dean – cover design and illustration
 Mansell Litho – plates

Charts

Certifications

References

Citations

Sources 
Books

 
 
 
 
 
 
 

 
 

 

 
 
 
 
 
 

Magazines
 

DVD media

External links
 Official Yes website at YesWorld

Yes (band) albums
Albums with cover art by Roger Dean (artist)
1973 albums
Concept albums
Albums produced by Eddy Offord
Atlantic Records albums